Transmission Impossible With Ed and Oucho is a CBBC show starring Ed Petrie and Oucho T. Cactus. Filmed at Pinewood Studios, it first aired on 16 May 2009 and was shown every Saturday morning on BBC Two and Sunday morning on the CBBC Channel for its run of 26 episodes. Transmission Impossible with Ed and Oucho ended on 9 August 2009 to allow Ed and Oucho to film Series 2 of Excellent Inventions.

Premise
The premise involved Ed and Oucho "hacking" into "your television" from their blimp, replacing The Krazey, Krazey, Krazey, Krazey, Krazey, Krazey, Krazey Show with Kaptain Krazey and Nigel Smith intended to be on air. Kaptain Krazey was a puppet pirate that only says "ooh aar" whilst Nigel Smith was Ed Petrie in a blonde wig.

Each Saturday episode, their blimp loses altitude, and one by one their four stowaways have to be pushed off. The stowaways play games, e.g. "Oucho's lossoli (Lovely) quiz", to determine who gets pushed off and whether or not they are awarded a parachute.

Programmes
The Saturday episodes include (Broadcast on BBC Two at 10am and available on BBC iPlayer):
The Pinky and Perky Show
The Secret Show
The Legend of Dick and Dom

The Sunday editions feature (Broadcast on the CBBC Channel at 10am but not available on BBC iPlayer):
Eliot Kid
The Owl (Episodes 6 & 12 only)
Sorry, I've Got No Head
Horrible Histories (Originally repeated from BBC One Thursday)

Episodes

References

External links
 
Official Transmission Impossible Site

BBC children's television shows
2000s British children's television series
2009 British television series debuts
2009 British television series endings
British television shows featuring puppetry